Tillandsia biflora is a species in the genus Tillandsia. This species is native to Panama, Nicaragua, Colombia, Peru, Bolivia, Costa Rica, Venezuela and Ecuador.

References

biflora
Flora of South America
Flora of Central America
Plants described in 1802